The 1835–1858 revolt in Ottoman Tripolitania began at the end of the Karamanli rule, in which tribal leaders such as 'Abd al-Jalil and Ghuma al-Mahmudi revolted against central Ottoman rule, which ended after Ghuma's death in 1858.

References

19th-century rebellions
Wars involving the Ottoman Empire
Wars involving Libya
19th century in the Ottoman Empire
19th century in Libya
1835 in the Ottoman Empire
1835 in Africa